Louie Spence's Showbusiness is a docusoap follow-up series to the hit show Pineapple Dance Studios. After initially indicating that a second series of Pineapple Dance Studios would be produced, Sky1 reverted this decision due to failing to come to terms with studio owner Debbie Moore. Louie Spence's Showbusiness had the same format as its predecessor Pineapple Dance Studios and continued, among other things, to follow Pineapple Studios and its characters such as Louie Spence, Andrew Stone and  Tricia Walsh-Smith, although Walsh-Smith did not return until episode eight, despite being featured in the opening titles. The show ended after one series.

References

External links

 http://triciawalshsmith.com/

Sky UK original programming
2011 British television series debuts
2011 British television series endings